The Oti Valley Faunal Reserve is a protected area in northeastern Togo, one of four Important Bird Areas (IBA) in the country. The site is mainly savanna and seasonally inundated floodplains on either side of the Oti River.

Description
The site is in the Savanes Region of northeastern Togo, extending from the border with Burkina Faso and Benin, southwards to the edge of the Kéran National Park, another IBA, just to the east of the city of Sansanné-Mango. The grassland is largely composed of Andropogon, Heteropogon and Hyparrhenia  species, with a scattering of Borassus  aethiopum. In the gallery forests by the watercourses, Diospyros mespiliformis and Anogeissus leiocarpa predominate, along with the lower-growing Mimosa pigra and Mitragyna inermis. There are also pockets of Sudanian Savanna, with  Acacia  species, Combretum species, Tamarindus indica and Balanites aegyptiaca.

Fauna
Birds typical of the Sudan–Guinea Savanna biome found here include the fox kestrel, the Senegal parrot, the violet turaco, the red-throated bee-eater, the bearded barbet, the sun lark, the yellow-billed shrike, the blackcap babbler, the green-backed eremomela, the splendid sunbird, the black-rumped waxbill, the Sahel bush sparrow, the Heuglin's masked weaver, the purple starling, the piapiac, the Narina trogon and the Oriole warbler.

Wetland birds visiting the reserve include the black crowned crane, the grey heron, the white stork, the spur-winged goose and the collared pratincole. The saddle-billed stork breeds here and the white-backed night heron is an occasional visitor. Additionally, the pallid harrier and the great snipe have been recorded at the reserve, and the red-fronted gazelle, rated as "vulnerable" by the IUCN, is also present.

Conservation
Despite being listed as a faunal reserve, the area is threatened by illegal settlements, poaching and the gathering of firewood. The flow of the river may also vary because of the construction of a dam upstream in Burkina Faso. In addition, in 2008 the Bassin versant Oti-Mandouri was designated as a Ramsar site, a wetland habitat of international importance.

References

Protected areas of Togo
Faunal reserves